Francisco Sarmiento de Mendoza (Burgos, 10 July 1525 - Jaén, 9 June 1595) was a Spanish canon lawyer and bishop.

Life
Mendoza was born into a noble family at Burgos.  At the age of 21 years he already occupied a professorial chair in canon law at Salamanca. After being auditor for six years at Valladolid, he was appointed Auditor of the Rota in Rome, and held this office for twelve years.

In 1574 he became Bishop of Astorga; he was transferred to the See of Jaén in 1580. He died at Jaén.

Works

Among his works on canon law are "Selectarum interpretationum libri VIII" (Rome, 1571, Burgos, 1573, 1575, Antwerp, 1616), and "De redditibus eccleciasticis" (Rome, 1569, Burgos, 1573, 1575). In the latter, which is dedicated to Pope Pius V, he argues against Martin Azpilcueta, that clerics are not bound in justice, but only in charity, to give to the poor that part of their revenues which is not necessary for their own sustenance. His complete works were published in three volumes (Antwerp, 1616).

References

Attribution
 The entry cites:
Nicolas Antonio, Bibliotheca Hispana nova (Madrid, 1783-8), I, 476; 
Schulte, Die Geschichte der Quellen und Literatur des Canonichen Rechtes (Stuttgart, 1880), I, 29.

1595 deaths
Canon law jurists
Bishops of Astorga
Bishops of Jaén
Year of birth unknown
University of Salamanca alumni
Academic staff of the University of Salamanca
16th-century Spanish jurists
1525 births
16th-century Roman Catholic bishops in Spain